Patricia Adkins Chiti (? – 12 June 2018) was a mezzo-soprano and musicologist involved in projects by and for women. She created the Fondazione Adkins Chiti: Donne in Musica (Adkins Chiti Foundation: Women in Music) in the nineteen-nineties, after starting Donne in Musica in 1978, and was a promoter of research projects regarding women in music, for which she was recognised worldwide. She received numerous prizes and awards, including the Premio de Investigación Musical "Rosario Marciano" ("Rosario Marciano" Musical Research Award).

Biography
Patricia Chiti was a professional musician and musicologist. Born in England, she acted in public from childhood. She completed her studies at the Guildhall School of Music and Drama in London and the Teatro dell'Opera in Rome, where she made her operatic debut in 1972. Since the sixties she was married to the Italian composer, Gian Paolo Chiti. She spoke English, Italian, French and German; in 2012 she was stated to be studying Arabic. In 2004, the President of Italy honoured her with the title of Cavaliere Ufficiale of the Italian Republic. Patricia Chiti wrote and published academic books and articles, more than 500 around the world, on the history of women in music, and edited publications about the Baroque period and music of the eighteenth century. She wrote 40 books and about 800 scholarly articles on women as composers and creators of musical culture, has also written the history of singers and musical families for publishers in Italy, Europe, Asia, the United States and Latin America and prepared editions musical reviews of works by women in Italy and the United States. Beginning in 2000, she collected second-hand music, books and CDs, and sent them to many parts of the world, especially to Africa, Latin America and Eastern Europe. She died suddenly and unexpectedly on 12 June 2018.

News
In recent years, her activities included the production of an opera for the International Mozart celebrations in Vienna, the publication of academic volumes, including a book on the history of women in jazz, and a history of women in the Mediterranean region. The Fondazione Adkins Chiti: Donne in Musica organisation has also published more than 50 books on the history of women as composers, in English, Italian and Arabic.

Patricia Chiti was a supporter of the European Parliament which has passed a law that provides for Equal Opportunities for Women in Arts and Culture. Since 1980 she conducted festivals, concert series and symposiums in Italy and abroad and she also worked closely as an expert in cultural policy with governments and universities in Europe, USA and Asia. She was a member of the Italian Commission in favour of Equal Opportunities when in March 1988, with an invitation from the Director General of UNESCO, she presented her own proposals in favour of women in the Intergovernmental World Conference for Cultural Policy in favour of Development (The World Intergovernmental Conference for Cultural Policies for Development).

She was President of the international Fondazione Adkins Chiti: Donne in Musica. In 2012, she supervised the collection of materials for the Conservatory in L'Aquila after the earthquake there.

Selected bibliography
 'Donne in musica' Patricia Adkins Chiti. EAN: 2560007355544, 1982
 'Almanacco delle virtuose, primedonne, compositrici e musiciste d'Italia dall' A.D. 177 ai giorni nostri.' ('...looks at women musicians through the ages from approx. 1500 up until the present') Chiti, Patricia Adkins.  / , 1991
 'Una voce poco fa. Le musiche delle prime donne rossiniane' Adkins Chiti, Patricia,  / , 1992 
 Italian Art Songs of the Romantic Era (songs by Rossini, Donizetti and others, from the private collection of the editor) Chiti, Patricia Adkins (editor)/ Paton, John Glenn (con)  / , 1994
 'Donne in musica (Donne del terzo millennio)' (Italian Edition) Patricia Adkins Chiti  / , 1996
 Songs and Duets of Garcia, Malibran and Viardot: Rediscovered Songs by Legendary Singers: Low (Alfred Vocal Masterworks Series) Patricia Adkins Chiti (Editor), John Glenn Paton (Contributor)  / , 1997

Selected recordings
 The Music of the Primadonnas Patricia Adkins Chiti, Gianpaolo Chiti, 2011 • 14 songs • Kicco Music
 Desolation and Despair (Italian Drawing Room Music of the Romantic Era) Patricia Adkins Chiti, Hiroko Sato, 2011 • 13 songs • Kicco Music

See also
Women in classical music

References

Year of birth missing
1940s births
2018 deaths
21st-century English women singers
21st-century English singers
English emigrants to Italy
Alumni of the Guildhall School of Music and Drama
English mezzo-sopranos
English musicologists
Italian mezzo-sopranos
Italian musicologists